The Edgar Building is a building in Grand Forks, North Dakota that was listed on the National Register of Historic Places in 1983.  Its construction date is unclear.

It included Zig zag moderne architecture.

The listing was for an area of less than one acre with just one contributing building.

The listing is described in its North Dakota Cultural Resources Survey document.

The property was covered in a 1981 study of Downtown Grand Forks historical resources.

References

Commercial buildings on the National Register of Historic Places in North Dakota
Art Deco architecture in North Dakota
National Register of Historic Places in Grand Forks, North Dakota